Ian Kirke (born 26 December 1981) is an English former professional rugby league footballer who played in the 2000s and 2010s. He played the majority of his career for the Leeds Rhinos in the Super League, for whom he made over 200 appearances and won the Super League Grand Final on five occasions. He also played for the Wakefield Trinity Wildcats in the Super League, and for the York City Knights in National League Two.

Playing career
Kirke started his career at Hull Kingston Rovers, making his senior debut in 2000. After spending a year in Hull F.C.'s Alliance side, he joined York Wasps for the 2002 season. In April 2002, he signed for Dewsbury Rams.

He made his Leeds début on Sunday 5 March 2006 when Leeds played Castleford. During the close season 2006 he had surgery on both his shoulders to fix a long term injury. He was a pupil at Hornsea School and Language College.

After spells at Dewsbury, Hull FC and Hull Kingston Rovers, Kirke's breakthrough came at York City as he quietly set about laying the foundations for their National League Two triumph. Tony Rea took him on loan to London Broncos, and Leeds acted on the hint and snapped him up. His father, Bob Kirke, used to play for Hull Kingston Rovers, and as of 2011, he is a Year-3 teacher at Hornsea Community Primary School.

Kirke played in the 2008 Super League Grand Final victory over St Helens.

Kirke played in the 2009 Super League Grand Final victory over St Helens at Old Trafford.

Kirke played in the 2010 Challenge Cup Final defeat by Warrington at Wembley Stadium.

In July 2011, Kirke was given a new two-year contract at Leeds. Later that year he played from the substitute bench for Leeds in the 2011 Challenge Cup Final defeat by Wigan at Wembley Stadium. Kirke played in the 2011 Super League Grand Final victory over St Helens at Old Trafford.

Kirke played in the 2012 Challenge Cup Final defeat by Warrington at Wembley Stadium. Kirke played in the 2012 Super League Grand Final victory over Warrington at Old Trafford.

Kirke played in the 2014 Challenge Cup Final victory over the Castleford Tigers at Wembley Stadium.

References

1980 births
Living people
English rugby league players
People from Hornsea
Rugby league props
Rugby league second-rows
Hull Kingston Rovers players
York Wasps players
Dewsbury Rams players
York City Knights players
Leeds Rhinos players
London Broncos players
Wakefield Trinity players